Syndemis duplex is a species of moth of the family Tortricidae. It is found in Vietnam.

References

	

Moths described in 1948
Archipini